Calderón is a rural parish of Quito Canton, Pichincha Province, Ecuador. It lies northeast of the city of Quito, on Ecuador Highway 35 (designated by the Ecuadorian transit police as E-35), a north-to-south-running highway which is the Ecuadorian segment of the Pan-American Highway.

The seat of the parish (the village) is particularly known for its cemetery, which attracts visitors during All Souls' Day (11-02), and for its decorative masapán figurines.

Parishes of Quito Canton